Momot is a gender-neutral Slavic surname that may refer to
Anatoliy Momot (born 1958), Ukrainian football coach 
Vitaliy Momot (born 1990), Ukrainian football defender

See also
 

Polish-language surnames
Ukrainian-language surnames